Erianthemum is a genus of flowering plants belonging to the family Loranthaceae.

Its native range is Tropical and Southern Africa.

Species:

Erianthemum aethiopicum 
Erianthemum alveatum 
Erianthemum commiphorae 
Erianthemum dregei 
Erianthemum lanatum 
Erianthemum lindense 
Erianthemum melanocarpum 
Erianthemum ngamicum 
Erianthemum nyikense 
Erianthemum occultum 
Erianthemum rotundifolium 
Erianthemum schelei 
Erianthemum schmitzii 
Erianthemum taborensis 
Erianthemum virescens 
Erianthemum viticola

References

Loranthaceae
Loranthaceae genera
Afrotropical realm flora